Later Alligator may refer to:

 See You Later, Alligator, a 1956 single originally titled "Later, Alligator"
 Later Alligator (video game), a 2019 video game